UDT may refer to:

Organisations
 Uitgeverij De Tijd, a former Belgian publisher
 Underwater Demolition Team, United States Naval reconnaissance and amphibious landing beach demolition unit from which the  U.S. Navy SEALs evolved
 União Democrática Timorense, (Timorese Democratic Union), a conservative political party in East Timor
 Union Démocratique Tchadienne, (Chadian Democratic Union), the second African political party in Chad
 Union of Djibouti Workers, a trade union centre in Djibouti
 United Dominions Trust, a subsidiary of the former Trustee Savings Bank, merged with Lloyds Bowmaker in 2001

Computing
 UDP-based Data Transfer Protocol, a high performance data transport protocol and library
 User-defined type, in computer science that is generally synonymous with "record", "structure", "composite type" or "class"

Technology
 Urine Diversion Toilet, a toilet system where urine and faeces are separated at source